John Antonakis (born March 29, 1969) is a professor of organizational behavior at the Faculty of Business and Economics of the University of Lausanne and current editor-in-chief of The Leadership Quarterly.

Life
He was born and raised in South Africa of Greek parents (Paul Antonakis and Irene Bardi) and is Swiss naturalized. He received his Ph.D. in applied management and decision sciences (Walden University) with a focus on leadership measurement and psychometrics, and was a post-doc in cognitive psychology (Yale University); he did undergraduate work at the University of the Witwatersrand (Wits) in business and economics, and received his Bachelor and master's degrees at Johnson and Wales University in business administration.

Specialty: leadership
He specializes in leadership and charismatic leadership in particular. He has communicated his work on leadership to a wide audiences, including work in applied statistics on endogeneity and causality, and general problems in science. His article "Predicting Elections: Child's Play" published in the prestigious journal Science engendered a lot of interest because it showed that little children were able to predict results of election outcomes merely by rating the faces of the politician candidates; refer to his podcast for further information. Lately, he has been working with Philippe Jacquart in predicting the U.S. presidential elections; their model predicted that Obama would win (refer to Antonakis's YouTube video on the Obama-Romney election race). He predicted a victory for Trump in the 2016 and 2020 elections. A summary of his latest work on charisma is available in a recent talk he gave at TEDx.

Scientific positions
Antonakis has written broadly on topics germane to organizational behavior, including on leadership, social cognition, individual differences and methodology (psychometrics and applied econometrics). A common thread in his research is correct measurement, as well as correct causal specification, design, and analysis. For instance, he has been critical of the concept of emotional intelligence particularly self-measures; his research suggests that emotional intelligence measures are not developed enough to be used for clinical purposes or in work-related or educational settings, and that emotional intelligence is not needed for leadership. As proponent of consistent estimators and causally identified models using econometrics and structural equation modeling techniques, he has also written critiques of Partial least squares path modeling, which he states should be abandoned. He has also shown that, because of endogeneity issues, much of the research done in management and applied psychology is devoid of causal interpretation.

References

External links 
 Let's face it: Charisma matters
 Podcast on "Endogeneity: An inconvenient truth

1969 births
Living people
Academic staff of the University of Lausanne
Place of birth missing (living people)
Walden University alumni
Yale University alumni
University of the Witwatersrand alumni
Johnson & Wales University alumni
South African people of Greek descent
Swiss people of Greek descent
Naturalised citizens of Switzerland